Acrocoelites is a genus of belemnite, an extinct group of cephalopods.

Species 
Species placed by fossilworks.

 Acrocoelites bobeti Lissajous 1927
 Acrocoelites brevisulcatus Quenstedt 1848
 Acrocoelites conoideus Oppel 1856
 Acrocoelites ilminstrensis Phillips 1867
 Acrocoelites inaequistriatus Simpson 1855
 Acrocoelites levidensis Simpson 1855
 Acrocoelites oxyconus Hehl 1831 
 Acrocoelites pyramidalis Munster 1831
 Acrocoelites riegrafi Doyle 1992
 Acrocoelites rostriformis Theodori 1837
 Acrocoelites subtenuis Simpson 1855
 Acrocoelites tripartitus von Schlotheim 1820
 Acrocoelites vulgaris Young and Bird 1822

See also

 Belemnite
 List of belemnites

References

Belemnites